Stuart Arthur Kornfeld is a professor of medicine at Washington University in St. Louis and researcher in glycobiology.

Early life and education 
Kornfeld was born in St. Louis on October 4, 1936 to Ruth and Max Kornfeld. He graduated from Ladue Horton Watkins High School in 1954. He received his A.B. in 1958 from Dartmouth College and his MD in 1962 from Washington University School of Medicine. In 1959, he married Rosalind Hauk, a PhD student at Washington University.

Career 
After medical school, Kornfeld did an internship at Barnes Hospital in St. Louis, and spent 2 years (1963–1965) as a research associate at the National Institute of Arthritis and Metabolic Diseases of the National Institutes of Health. He then returned to Washington University where he has remained since, serving as the school's hematology division head for thirty years. He and his wife Rosalind, with whom he collaborated scientifically, were recruited to the faculty in 1966 alongside Phil Majerus by the University's Chairman of Medicine. Kornfeld was first an instructor of medicine, was promoted to assistant professor, and eventually professor in 1972. From 1991 to 1997, he served as the director of the Medical Scientist Training Program.

Awards 
 1972—Elected to the American Society for Clinical Investigation
 1976—Elected to the Association of American Physicians
 1982—Elected to the National Academy of Sciences
 1983—Elected to the Institute of Medicine
 1984—Elected to the American Academy of Arts and Sciences
 1992 E. Donnall Thomas Prize, American Society of Hematology (inaugural recipient)
 1999—Karl Meyer Award, Society for Glycobiology
 2010—E. B. Wilson Medal, American Society for Cell Biology (with James Rothman and Randy Schekman)
 2010—Kober Medal, Association of American Physicians
2012—Herbert Tabor/Journal of Biological Chemistry Lectureship, American Society for Biochemistry and Molecular Biology

References

Further reading 

 

1936 births
Living people
Washington University School of Medicine faculty
Washington University School of Medicine alumni
Dartmouth College alumni
American scientists
Ladue Horton Watkins High School alumni
Members of the National Academy of Medicine